Ana Galindo may refer to:

 Ana Galindo (swimmer) (born 1987), Honduran swimmer
 Ana Galindo (gymnast) (born 2003), Mexican rhythmic gymnast
 Ana Galindo Santolaria (born 1973), Spanish alpine skier
 Ana Galindo (football manager) (born 1985), Mexican Football Manager